Theodore Conyngham Kingsmill Moore (16 March 1893 – 21 January 1979) was an Irish judge, politician and author.

Kingsmill Moore was born in Dublin to Canon Henry Kingsmill Moore, Principal of the Church of Ireland College of Education, and Constance Turpin. He was educated at Marlborough College, Wiltshire and Trinity College Dublin. While he was Auditor of the College Historical Society, W. B. Yeats spoke at the inaugural meeting of his session. Moore served in the Royal Flying Corps from 1917 to 1918, and was called to the Irish Bar in 1918, to the Inner Bar in 1934, and became a bencher of King's Inns in 1941.

Also an author of highly regarded books on fly fishing, Kingsmill Moore was elected for the Dublin University constituency as an independent member of Seanad Éireann for the 4th Seanad from 1943 to 1944 and to the 5th Seanad from 1944 to 1948. He resigned from the Seanad in 1947 on his appointment as a judge of the High Court.

He was a judge of the Irish High Court from 1947 to 1951, and of the Supreme Court of Ireland from 1951 to 1966.

A Kingsmill Moore Memorial Prize is given to students of Law at Trinity College Dublin scoring the highest marks of the first and second divisions.

References

1893 births
1979 deaths
Auditors of the College Historical Society
Judges of the Supreme Court of Ireland
Members of the 5th Seanad
Members of the 4th Seanad
Independent members of Seanad Éireann
Alumni of Trinity College Dublin
Irish writers
Irish barristers
High Court judges (Ireland)
People educated at Marlborough College
Members of Seanad Éireann for Dublin University